Kel'el Ware (born April 20, 2004) is an American college basketball player for the Oregon Ducks of the Pac-12 Conference. He was a consensus five-star recruit and one of the top players in the 2022 class.

Early life and high school career
Ware grew up in North Little Rock, Arkansas and attended North Little Rock High School. As a junior, he averaged 16.2 points, 9.1 rebounds, and 4.1 blocks per game. As a senior, Ware averaged 20.3 points, 12 rebounds, and 5.7 blocks per game. He also played in the Jordan Brand Classic, Nike Hoop Summit, and the 2022 McDonald's All-American Boys Game during his senior year.

Recruiting
Ware is a consensus five-star recruit and one of the top players in the 2022 class, according to major recruiting services. On August 9, 2021, he committed to playing college basketball for Oregon over offers from Arkansas, Auburn, Baylor, Illinois, Kansas, Memphis, Texas A&M, and Texas Tech. Ware was also offered a two-year contract for $900,000 from Overtime Elite, but he declined offer and maintained his commitment to Oregon.

College career
Ware entered his freshman season at Oregon as the Ducks' second center. He also entered the season as a potential first-round selection in the 2023 NBA draft.

National team career
Ware played for the United States under-18 basketball team at the 2022 FIBA Under-18 Americas Championship. He was named to the All-Tournament team after averaging 15.7 points, 6.8 rebounds, and 1.8 blocks as the United States won the gold medal.

References

External links
Oregon Ducks bio
USA Basketball bio

2004 births
Living people
American men's basketball players
Basketball players from Arkansas
McDonald's High School All-Americans
Centers (basketball)
Oregon Ducks men's basketball players
People from North Little Rock, Arkansas